Thara is a 1972 Indian Malayalam-language film,  directed by M. Krishnan Nair and produced by M. Kunchacko. The film stars Prem Nazir, Sathyan, Sharada and Usha. The film had musical score by G. Devarajan.

Cast

Prem Nazir as Venugopalan
Sathyan as Balakrishna Pilla
Sharada (Double Role) as Vasanthi/Thara
Jayabharathi as Usha
KPAC Lalitha
Adoor Bhasi as Velupilla
Thikkurissy Sukumaran Nair as Keshavan Kutty
Adoor Bhavani as Pankajam
Adoor Pankajam as Hostel Warden
Alummoodan as Pappu
Aranmula Ponnamma as Kamalamma
K. P. Ummer as Gopinathan Nair
Kottayam Chellappan as Vikraman Pilla
Pankajavalli as Matron
S. P. Pillai as Ayyappan
Vijaya Kumari as Kalikutty
Changanassery Natarajan

Soundtrack
The music was composed by G. Devarajan and the lyrics were written by Vayalar Ramavarma.

References

External links
 

1970 films
1970s Malayalam-language films
Films directed by M. Krishnan Nair